The 2019 Adelaide 500 (known for commercial reasons as the 2019 Superloop Adelaide 500) is a motor racing event for the Supercars Championship held on Thursday 28 February through to Sunday 3 March 2019. The event was held at the Adelaide Street Circuit in Adelaide, South Australia, and marked the twenty-first running of the Adelaide 500. It wasl the first event of fifteen in the 2019 Supercars Championship and consisted of two races of 250 kilometres. The race was supported by the opening round of the 2019 Super2 Series, a championship for older models of Supercars.

The race saw the competitive début of the Ford Mustang GT, which replaced the FG X Falcon. The Adelaide 500 was the first time that a Mustang had competed in a round of the Australian Touring Car Championship since 1990.

McLaughlin's win in Race One was the first time that the Ford Mustang had won a race in the Australian Touring Car Championship since Allan Moffat won the final round of the 1972 season at Oran Park Raceway 46 years earlier - in that instance won in a Boss 302 Mk.1 edition.

Results

Race 1

Race

Race 2

Race

References

External links

Adelaide 500
Adelaide 500
Adelaide 500
2010s in Adelaide